Nordic Americans have constituted a long-running ethnic presence in New York City since its very founding.

Danes
The first Danes in New York were sailors in the crew of Henry Hudson’s ship the Halve Maen, which sailed into New York Harbor in 1609. Among the Danish settlers in New York was Jonas Bronck, who in 1629 bought a large tract of land north of Manhattan. The Bronk surname might be the etymological origin behind the Bronx. In 1675 lived at least 100 Danes in New York. In 1704 the Danes together with the Norwegians build a small Lutheran chapel near the intersection of Broadway and Rector Street. Danish immigration reached its peak between 1850 and 1900 were most Danes only passed through the city to get elsewhere in the United States. Most Danish immigrants were Lutheran but many married outside their religious and ethnic group. The health insurance organization for Scandinavian immigrants, Dania, opened a branch in Brooklyn in 1886. From 1891 to 1953 a Danish language newspaper, Nordlyset(The Northern Light) was published. In 1930 there were around 200.000 people of Danish descent. The best-known Dane from New York is Jacob A. Riis, a photographer and writer, who wrote the book How the Other Half Lives which exposed the poor living conditions in the slums of New York. He was called “New
York’s most useful citizen” by President Theodore Roosevelt and his work led to new reforms and regulations.
Another famous Dane is actress Scarlett Johansson, who is the daughter of a Danish immigrant from Copenhagen.

Finns
Before the nineteenth most of the Finns in New York were sailors. Because of that the Finnish Seamen’s Mission was founded in 1887 by Emil Panelius, which was the first Finnish religious organization in the city. In the 1900 census the city had about 10.000 people of Finnish descent. A Finnish language newspaper, New Yorkin Uutiset(New York News), was published from 1906 to 1996. In 1930 the number of people with Finnish descent reached a bit over 20.000. In 2010 there lived 3000 Finns in the New York City metropolitan area.

Norwegians
The first Norwegians immigrated to New Amsterdam during the seventeenth century. One of the immigrants was Anneken Henriksen who married Jan Arentzen van der Bilt a forebear of the Vanderbilt family. The booming maritime industry attracted Norwegians to the city to work with the industry. In 1869 there lived about 6000 Norwegians in New York with most living in Brooklyn. In 1940 there were about 55.000 first and second generation Norwegians in New York. In 1990 the Norwegian population in the city had fallen to about 10.000 and in 2007 more than 20.000 claimed to be of Norwegian descent. One of the best known Norwegian from New York is Thor Solberg, a pioneer in aviator, who was the first person to fly solo from the United States to Norway in 1935.

Swedes
One of the first Swedes in New York was Mons Pieterson, a Swedish speaking Finn, who together with other Swedish immigrants helped clear out Harlem, which was cleared by 1661. By 1835 there were about 100 Swedes in New York. The first Swedish language newspaper, Skandinaven, was published from 1851 to 1853. In the mid-nineteenth century many Swedish emigrated to the United States because of land shortages and compulsory military service. Many immigrants only passed through the City to get to elsewhere in the United States. By 1870 the Swedish population was around 3000. In 1900 there were around 28.000 Swedes in New York with about 15.000 in Brooklyn and about 11.000 in Manhattan. In 1930 there were 37,200 Swedish immigrants and 24,500 non immigrants of Swedish descent in the city. As the economy improved in Sweden fewer immigrants arrived and by 1980 there were about 3000 Swedish immigrants in New York. In 1996 the Swedish consulate in New York began sponsoring the Swedish Midsummer Celebration in Battery Park.

References 

 
 
American
American
American
American
American
European-American culture in New York City